Little Ilford School is a coeducational secondary school located in Little Ilford in the London Borough of Newham in London, United Kingdom. It enrolled 1434 students and has been described by Ofsted as outstanding in their last inspection in 2012.

Construction of new building 
In 2014, it was announced that Little Ilford School would be part of the Priority School Building Programme (PSBP), a government scheme to rebuild or refurbish school buildings in the worst condition, after its original building was deemed not fit for purpose. Under the programme, the school started the construction of a new £22.8m four-storey building, designed by CPMG with the construction contract being awarded to Wates. The demolition of the original school building was executed at the new building's completion and all students and staff moved to the new facility in 2016.

Planned expansion 
In 2019, Newham Council announced proposals to expand Little Ilford School from 10 forms of entry to 12 due to a forecasted increase of Year 7 admissions after September 2019. This would increase the school's capacity from around 1,500 students to 1,800 and initial budget estimates show a cost of £13.1m. Staff have expressed concerns for the proposals, claiming they will affect the quality of education in the school, with 85% stating they have concerns or major reservations. 7 of the school governors voted in favour of the plans, 5 against and 2 abstained. National Education Union members organised staff walkouts and strike action in protest of the proposals.

Notable former pupils
Bobby Zamora, footballer

References

External links

Secondary schools in the London Borough of Newham
Educational institutions established in 1959
1959 establishments in England
Community schools in the London Borough of Newham
Ilford